Girolamo Melzi (1599–1672) was a Roman Catholic prelate who served as Bishop of Pavia (1659–1672).

Biography
Girolamo Melzi was born in 1599 and ordained a priest on 21 Sep 1659.
On 22 Sep 1659, he was appointed during the papacy of Pope Alexander VII as Bishop of Pavia.
On 16 Nov 1659, he was consecrated bishop by Giacomo Corradi, Cardinal-Priest of Santa Maria in Traspontina, with Marco Antonio Tomati, Bishop Emeritus of Bitetto, and Marcantonio Oddi, Bishop of Perugia, 
serving as co-consecrators. 
He served as Bishop of Pavia until his death on 29 Sep 1672.

References

External links and additional sources
 (for Chronology of Bishops) 
 (for Chronology of Bishops)  

17th-century Italian Roman Catholic bishops
Bishops appointed by Pope Alexander VII
1599 births
1672 deaths